Jarno Laasala (born 19 September 1979) is a Finnish filmmaker and stunt performer. He is a member and co-founder of the stunt group the Dudesons and the former CEO of the production company Rabbit Films.

As a child Laasala was a Super Mario Bros. (Nintendo) champion in Finland.

In addition to being the CEO of Rabbit Films, Laasala studied and completed a Masters of Science degree.

Personal life
Laasala has three children with his ex-wife, Hanne Maria Laasala (Savunen). Laasala was diagnosed with melanoma in the spring of 2017, but he was cured by surgery.

Filmography

TV

Film

References

External links 

Living people
1979 births
People from Seinäjoki
Finnish male film actors
Finnish stunt performers